Rāwhiti or Te Rāwhiti is a small beachfront town about 27km from Russell in the Bay of Islands of New Zealand. Most of the land in the area is owned by Māori. There are two marae — Kaingahoa and Te Rāwhiti.

Rāwhiti was home to the Ngāre Raumati iwi prior to 1826, when elements of the Ngāpuhi iwi raided the eastern regions of the Bay of Islands, defeating them and taking their lands by conquest. This was in retaliation for a raid on Okuratope pā at Waimate North by the Ngāre Raumati in 1800, where the chief Te Maoi's wife, Te Auparo, and their daughter, Te Karehu, were murdered and eaten.

Rāwhiti is now home to the descendants of a number of former Ngāpuhi war chiefs including brothers Rewa and Moka 'Kainga-mataa'. Their older brother Te Wharerahi chose to reside nearby at Paroa Bay. These three brothers formed the Patukeha (killing in a turnip garden) hapū in memory of their slain mother, Te Auparo.

Marae

The area has two Ngāpuhi marae. Kaingahoa Rāwhiti Marae and its Tūmanako meeting house are affiliated with the hapū of Patukeha. Te Rāwhiti or Omakiwi Marae and Te Rāwhiti meeting house are affiliated with Ngāti Kuta and Patukeha.

In October 2020, the Government committed $205,804 from the Provincial Growth Fund to upgrade Te Rāwhiti Marae, creating 9 jobs.

Demographics
Rāwhiti is in an SA1 statistical area which includes Cape Brett Peninsula and the eastern islands in the Bay of Islands. The SA1 area is part of the larger Russell Forest-Rawhiti statistical area.

The SA1 statistical area had a population of 138 at the 2018 New Zealand census, an increase of 3 people (2.2%) since the 2013 census, and a decrease of 12 people (−8.0%) since the 2006 census. There were 45 households, comprising 57 males and 81 females, giving a sex ratio of 0.7 males per female. The median age was 43.0 years (compared with 37.4 years nationally), with 30 people (21.7%) aged under 15 years, 27 (19.6%) aged 15 to 29, 57 (41.3%) aged 30 to 64, and 24 (17.4%) aged 65 or older.

Ethnicities were 37.0% European/Pākehā, 82.6% Māori, 13.0% Pacific peoples, 2.2% Asian, and 2.2% other ethnicities. People may identify with more than one ethnicity.

Although some people chose not to answer the census's question about religious affiliation, 37.0% had no religion, 28.3% were Christian, 21.7% had Māori religious beliefs, and 4.3% had other religions.

Of those at least 15 years old, 3 (2.8%) people had a bachelor's or higher degree, and 21 (19.4%) people had no formal qualifications. The median income was $20,200, compared with $31,800 nationally. The employment status of those at least 15 was that 33 (30.6%) people were employed full-time, 12 (11.1%) were part-time, and 15 (13.9%) were unemployed.

Russell Forest-Rawhiti statistical area

Russell Forest-Rawhiti had a population of 690 at the 2018 New Zealand census, an increase of 30 people (4.5%) since the 2013 census, and an increase of 42 people (6.5%) since the 2006 census. There were 255 households, comprising 324 males and 363 females, giving a sex ratio of 0.89 males per female. The median age was 48.3 years (compared with 37.4 years nationally), with 123 people (17.8%) aged under 15 years, 123 (17.8%) aged 15 to 29, 288 (41.7%) aged 30 to 64, and 153 (22.2%) aged 65 or older.

Ethnicities were 47.0% European/Pākehā, 66.5% Māori, 5.7% Pacific peoples, 0.9% Asian, and 1.3% other ethnicities. People may identify with more than one ethnicity.

The percentage of people born overseas was 8.7, compared with 27.1% nationally.

Although some people chose not to answer the census's question about religious affiliation, 40.4% had no religion, 33.9% were Christian, 12.6% had Māori religious beliefs, 0.4% were Muslim, 0.4% were Buddhist and 1.7% had other religions.

Of those at least 15 years old, 51 (9.0%) people had a bachelor's or higher degree, and 135 (23.8%) people had no formal qualifications. The median income was $20,400, compared with $31,800 nationally. 27 people (4.8%) earned over $70,000 compared to 17.2% nationally. The employment status of those at least 15 was that 198 (34.9%) people were employed full-time, 108 (19.0%) were part-time, and 30 (5.3%) were unemployed.

External links

Far North District
Bay of Islands
Populated places in the Northland Region